Population figures from the 2021 statistics by the INE, the National Statistics Institute.

By population

By area

By density

This is a list of regions of Paraguay by Human Development Index as of 2017.

References 

Paraguay
Human Development Index
List
departments